Geethu Anna Jose (born 30 June 1985 in Kollad, Kottayam, Kerala, India) is an Indian basketball player who has been the captain of the Indian women's national basketball team.

Personal life

Jose was born in a Syro-Malabar Catholic Nasrani family that had little history of basketball playing. She was educated at Kottayam's Mount Carmel English Medium School, and at Assumption College, Changanacherry. Her brother Tom Jose is also a basketball player who represented the State of Kerala. Jose married Rahul Koshy on 8 January 2014. They have a son and a daughter.

Career

As a child, Jose played volleyball, first playing basketball with the Kerala Junior Basketball Association. While playing in a championship match for Kerala, she was spotted by the Southern Railway basketball team; she joined Southern Railway in 2003.

Jose played in the 2006 to 2008 Australian Big V seasons for the Ringwood Hawks, being the first Indian woman basketball player to play for an Australia club as a professional. In the 2008/9 season she was invited to play for Dandenong in the Australian Women's National Basketball League, but didn't take up the offer. In April 2011 WNBA teams, Chicago Sky, Los Angeles Sparks, and San Antonio Silver Stars invited her for tryouts.
In June 2012, Jose scored 11 points in the finals of the third Asian Beach Games at Haiyang, helping India to achieve a 17–14 victory over China.

Sporting credits

International
2002: Junior ABC in Chinese Taipei
2004: Senior ABC, Japan
2004: Invitation Tournament in Malaysia
2004-8: represented Indian Railways basketball team, winning 5 Senior Nationals
2005: silver medal in 20th Asian Basketball Confederation Championship for Senior Women, Sendai, Japan
2005: played in the Invitation Tournament at Phuket, with awards for MVP, best player, top scorer, top rebounder and also the Most Popular Player Award
2006: The Most Valuable Player Award and top scorer, rebounder and best shot-blocker prizes in the Melbourne (Australia) Commonwealth Games
2006: played in a friendly-match series at Auckland, New Zealand
2006: professional league player for the Australian Ringwood Hawks Club, Melbourne, Australia, receiving the Player of the month Award for July
2006: gold medal in the First Phuket International Invitational Basketball Championship, Thailand; awards for MVP, best player, top scorer, top rebounder, and most popular player.
2007: Australian League July Player of the Month Award
2007: winner in Pool-B at FIBA Asia Championship for Women, Incheon, South Korea
2008: selected for the WNBL
2008: Australian Most Valuable player of the Year
2009: silver medal for 3-on-3 basketball contest; Asian Indoor Games, Vietnam
2009: captain of the Indian Team at the FIBA Asian Basketball Championship for Senior women at Chennai
2009: top scorer for ABC, Chennai

Indian

Geethu received Arjuna Award the year 2014–15 for her outstanding contributions towards sport in India and International arena
 2000 Youth championship at M.P (Kerala team)
 2001: Junior nationals (Goa)
 2003: Junior nationals (Punjab)
 2003: Senior Nationals (Hyderabad)
 2004/5: represented the Indian Railways winning team in the 55th Senior Nationals competition (Ludhiana)
 2005/6: represented the Indian Railways winning team in the 56th Senior Nationals competition (Pune)
 2006/7: represented the Indian Railways winning team in the 57th Senior Nationals competition (Jaipur)
 2007: represented the Indian Railways winning team in the 58th Senior Nationals competition (Puducherry)
 2008/9: represented the Indian Railways team in the 59th Senior Nationals competition (Surat)
 2009/10: represented the Indian Railways winning team in the 60th Senior Nationals competition (Ludhiana)
 2003: represented Inter Railways team in the 27th All India Railway Basketball championship (Varanasi)
 2004: represented Inter Railways winning team in the 28th All India Railway Basketball championship (Lucknow)
 2005: represented Inter Railways team in the 29th All India Railway Basketball championship (Gorakhpur)
 2006: represented Inter Railways winning team in the 30th All India Railway Basketball championship (Guwahati)
 2007: represented Inter Railways winning team in the 31st All India Railway Basketball championship (Chennai)
 2008: represented Inter Railways team in the 32nd All India Railway Basketball championship (Guwahati)
 2009: represented Inter Railways winning team in the 33rd All India Railway Basketball championship (Jabalpur)
 2005 represented the winning Southern Railway team in the 21st Federation Cup (Bhavnagar)
 2007: represented the Southern Railway team in the 23rd Federation Cup (Rourkela)

References

External links

 
 
 

Indian women's basketball players
Sportspeople from Kottayam
1985 births
Living people
Malayali people
Basketball players from Kerala
Recipients of the Arjuna Award
Basketball players at the 2010 Asian Games
Sportswomen from Kerala
20th-century Indian women
20th-century Indian people
21st-century Indian women
21st-century Indian people
Asian Games competitors for India